The Show Champion Chart is a record chart on the South Korean MBC M television music program Show Champion. Every week, the show awards the best-performing single on the chart in the country during its live broadcast.

In 2022, 32 singles achieved number one on the chart, and 26 acts were awarded first-place trophies. "Beatbox" by NCT Dream had the highest score of the year, with 9,810 points on the June 8 broadcast. "Shut Down" by Blackpink is the only song to achieve a triple crown.

Chart history

References 

2022 in South Korean music
South Korea Show Champion
Lists of number-one songs in South Korea